Arracourt is a commune in the Meurthe-et-Moselle department in northeastern France.

History
The battle of Arracourt was a World War II clash of U.S. and German armored forces near Arracourt during September 18–29, 1944.

Population

See also
Communes of the Meurthe-et-Moselle department

References

Communes of Meurthe-et-Moselle